Goldens Bridge is a hamlet and census-designated place (CDP) in the town of Lewisboro in Westchester County, New York, United States. The population was 1,630 at the 2010 census.

Goldens Bridge is in the western part of the town, adjacent to Interstate 684 and the Croton River. Goldens Bridge is a suburb of New York City, as it is located approximately 30 miles (48 km) north of the Bronx.

History
According to The New York Times, "Colonial geographers and surveyors identified a crossing over the Croton River in the Goldens Bridge area as early as 1750. The early maps refer to the bridge by different names, including Coldens Bridge, Goldings Bridge and Goldens Bridge. The bridge was washed away and rebuilt a number of times as the area around the crossing began to grow into a depot for farm produce from Connecticut and Salem and a stop for travelers along the river. But there is no trace of the bridge today as it lies under the Croton Reservoir, which was created when the Croton River was dammed around the turn of the 20th century."

In the mid-20th century, the hamlet was home to a majority Jewish community, which governed itself under communal living standards, with many residents considering the community to be the true owner of the land their homes were built upon. Bridge L-158, a railroad bridge, was listed on the National Register of Historic Places in 1978.

On February 24, 2014, the hamlet's firehouse was the scene of a three alarm fire. A rescue truck, two SUVS, and a 1943 Willys Jeep Utility/Brush Truck were damaged or destroyed.

Geography
Goldens Bridge is located at  (41.287896, -73.668630).

Terrain
Goldens Bridge has a diverse terrain of several rocky hills, mostly with stones left from the last ice age. It is largely forested and includes many streams and lakes, as well as bordering the Muscoot Reservoir and the Cross River Reservoir.

Demographics

As of the census of 2000, there were 1,578 people, 572 households, and 431 families residing in the CDP. The population density was 503.8 per square mile (194.7/km2). There were 607 housing units at an average density of 193.8/sq mi (74.9/km2). The racial makeup of the CDP was 95.31% White, 1.39% African American, 2.34% Asian, 0.13% from other races, and 0.82% from two or more races. Hispanic or Latino of any race were 2.28% of the population.

There were 572 households, out of which 43.4% had children under the age of 18 living with them, 65.9% were married couples living together, 8.6% had a female householder with no husband present, and 24.5% were non-families. 19.1% of all households were made up of individuals, and 5.8% had someone living alone who was 65 years of age or older. The average household size was 2.76 and the average family size was 3.20.

In the CDP, the population was spread out, with 30.5% under the age of 18, 3.4% from 18 to 24, 31.9% from 25 to 44, 25.1% from 45 to 64, and 9.0% who were 65 years of age or older. The median age was 37 years. For every 100 females, there were 92.7 males. For every 100 females age 18 and over, there were 89.0 males.

The median income for a household in the CDP was $106,323, and the median income for a family was $113,460. Males had a median income of $81,072 versus $42,292 for females. The per capita income for the CDP was $52,050. About 2.5% of families and 2.4% of the population were below the poverty line, including 3.6% of those under age 18 and 7.7% of those age 65 or over.

Education
The Katonah-Lewisboro School District serves Golden's Bridge. Increase Miller Elementary School in Golden's Bridge and John Jay Middle School and John Jay High School in Cross River serve the community.

References

Census-designated places in New York (state)
Hamlets in New York (state)
Census-designated places in Westchester County, New York
Hamlets in Westchester County, New York
Populated places on the Underground Railroad